Kush (Balochi: , kill) is a mountain near Kalat, Pakistan. It is located not far from the similarly named Kushi mountain.

References

Hindu Kush
Mountains of Balochistan (Pakistan)
Two-thousanders of Pakistan